Jean-Dominique de La Rochefoucauld (30 June 1931 – 2 February 2011) was a French screenwriter and TV director.

In 1990, he was awarded the Prize XVIIe for his TV drama .

External links 

Film directors from Paris
1931 births
2011 deaths
French male screenwriters
French screenwriters